Ferdinando Colonna, 2nd Prince of Sonnino and 3rd Marquess of Castelnuovo (Grande de España) (21 September 1695 – 24 February 1775) was an Italian nobleman of the House of Colonna. He was Prince of Sonnino, Marquess of Castelnuovo, Grandee of Spain, Knight of the Order of Saint Januarius and Papal Master of the Horse. He was the son of Giuliano Colonna of Stigliano, son of Clelia Cesarini and Filippo Colonna, and Giovanna van den Eynde, daughter of Olimpia Piccolomini and Ferdinand van den Eynde, 1st Marquess of Castelnuovo, after whom he was named.

Life
Ferdinand wasn't the firstborn, but with the entry of his elder brother Girolamo into the Knights of Malta in 1714, and the death of the firstborn Lorenzo in 1715, he suddenly found himself in the position of heir apparent.

Ferdinand would go on to become Gentleman of the Chamber of the King of Naples in 1734, Knight of the Order of Saint Januarius in 1738, Papal Master of the Horse the same year, and Grandee of Spain in 1764.

His son Marcantonio would accomplish as much, going on to become Viceroy of the Kingdom of Sicily as well as Captain general of the latter.

Ferdinand died in Naples on February 24, 1775.

References

1695 births
1775 deaths
Colonna family
Italian nobility